Palaephatus spinosus is a moth of the  family Palaephatidae. It is found in forests in the Osorno Province of southern Chile.

The length of the forewings is 5–6 mm. Adults have dark fuscous forewings marked by scattered, pale yellowish white scales concentrated mainly over the middle third. They are on wing in February in one generation per year.

Etymology
The specific name is derived from Latin spinosus (meaning thorny) and refers to the irregular, spinose processes of the gnathos.

References

Moths described in 1986
Palaephatidae
Taxa named by Donald R. Davis (entomologist)
Endemic fauna of Chile